The 2017 Australian Football League finals series was the 121st annual edition of the VFL/AFL final series, the Australian rules football tournament staged to determine the winner of the 2017 AFL Premiership Season. The series ran over four weekends in September 2017, culminating with the 2017 AFL Grand Final at the Melbourne Cricket Ground on 30 September 2017.

The top eight teams from the season qualified for the finals series. AFL finals series have been played under the current format since 2000.

Qualification 

Perennial finalists  qualified for their eighth straight finals appearance, thus becoming the first team to reach the finals after starting a season with six straight losses.  qualified for the third straight year;  qualified for the fourteenth time in the past sixteen years,  and  both returned to the finals for the first time since 2014 and 2015 respectively, while  contested its second finals series since entering the AFL in 2012.  returned to the finals for the first time since 2014 and became the first wooden spooner to play finals the following year since  in 2011.

Venues
The matches of the 2017 AFL finals series will be contested at four venues around the country.

As was the case in 2015 and 2016, Melbourne will host only four finals matches, including the Grand Final, with all four played at the Melbourne Cricket Ground. The Adelaide Oval hosted three finals: 's first qualifying final against , their home preliminary final against , and 's elimination final against , while the Sydney Cricket Ground hosted 's elimination final against  and Spotless Stadium hosted 's first semi-final against West Coast.

Matches

The system used for the 2017 AFL finals series is a final eight system. The top four teams in the eight receive the "double chance" when they play in week-one qualifying finals, such that if a top-four team loses in the first week it still remains in the finals, playing a semi-final the next week against the winner of an elimination final. The bottom four of the eight play knock-out games – only the winners survive and move on to the next week. Home-state advantage goes to the team with the higher ladder position in the first two weeks, to the qualifying final winners in the third week.

In the second week, the winners of the qualifying finals receive a bye to the third week. The losers of the qualifying final plays the elimination finals winners in a semi-final. In the third week, the winners of the semi-finals from week two play the winners of the qualifying finals in the first week. The winners of those matches move on to the Grand Final at the MCG in Melbourne.

Week one (qualifying and elimination finals)

First qualifying final (Adelaide vs. Greater Western Sydney)
The first qualifying final saw the minor premiership winning Adelaide hosting the fourth placing Giants at Adelaide Oval in the second-ever Thursday night final. This was the first time Adelaide and Greater Western Sydney had met in the AFL Finals.
Adelaide player, Sam Jacobs' brother died a week before the game, he dedicated the game to his brother's memory and the Crows team wore black armbands in his honour.

Scorecard

Second qualifying final (Geelong vs. Richmond)
The second qualifying final saw second placed  host third placed  at the MCG. Geelong leapfrogged  with a comprehensive 44-point win over them in Round 23 to finish in the top two for the seventh time in the last ten years and in the top eight for the ninth time in the same period. By contrast, Richmond had played in the finals between 2013-2015 without success but a rejuvenated game style saw them climb back up the ladder, with a win against  in the final round seeing them climb up to third spot and earn the double chance for the first time since 2001, the last time they won a final.

This was the tenth final between the two sides and first in twenty-two years, having previously met in the finals in 1921, 1931, 1933, 1934, 1967, 1969, 1980, and 1995, including grand finals in 1931 and 1967. Head to head in finals it was 7-2 in Richmond's favour, despite Geelong's more recent successes.

Scorecard

Second elimination final (Sydney vs. Essendon)
The second elimination final saw sixth placed  host seventh placed  at the SCG. Both sides had defied the odds to qualify for the finals, with Sydney losing their first six games but recovering to become the first team to make the finals from that position, while Essendon were wooden spooners the previous year but a win against  in the final round sealed a spot in the finals.

This marked the third final between the two sides, having previously contested a preliminary final in 1996 in which Tony Lockett famously kicked a behind after the siren to put the Swans into the 1996 AFL Grand Final and a Qualifying Final in 1999 which the Bombers won convincingly by 69 points.

Scorecard

First elimination final (Port Adelaide vs. West Coast)
The first elimination final was held between fifth placed  and eighth placed  at the Adelaide Oval. Port Adelaide returned to the finals after a three year absence, finishing outside the top four and earning their first home final since 2014. West Coast entered the final round of the home and away season at the final AFL game at Domain Stadium needing to beat ladder leaders  by around four goals to leapfrog  into eighth spot. They achieved this, defeating the Crows by 29 points to earn their third finals appearance in as many years.

The two sides met in the finals once before, ten years previously in a qualifying final which Port Adelaide won by three points.

Scorecard

Week two (semi-finals)

Second semi-final (Geelong vs. Sydney)

Scorecard

First semi-final (Greater Western Sydney vs. West Coast)

Scorecard

Week three

First preliminary final (Adelaide vs. Geelong)

Second preliminary final (Richmond vs. Greater Western Sydney)

Week four (Grand Final)

References

External links

AFL finals series official website

Finals Series, 2017